Little Germany may refer to:

Little Germany, New York, a former neighborhood; a steamboat disaster sped up its decline
Little Germany, Bradford, a commercial and historic area, formerly influenced by local German merchants
Little Germany, Ontario (disambiguation)
Little Germany, Grey County, Ontario: in the Blue Mountains
Little Germany, Northumberland County, Ontario: in the Township of Alnwick/Haldimand
A former neighborhood in Lake City, Seattle, Washington
 "Little Germany", a political group in Cambridge that met at the White Horse Tavern during the English Reformation

See also
Germantown (disambiguation)